Sanda Parama (Arakanese:စန္ဒာပရမ;  was a king of the Mrauk-U Dynasty of Arakan.

References

Bibliography
 
 
 
 

Parama, Sanda
Parama, Sanda
Parama, Sanda